This is a list of films that are partly or entirely in Rajasthani.

References

External links
 Rajasthani films under production  
 
 Revival of regional film movement in Rajasthan
 Revival of Rajasthani Films
 Rajasthani language films at Internet Movie Database

Lists of films by language
 
Films, Rajasthani language
Lists of Indian films